William John Ellis Cox,  (born 1 April 1936) was Governor of Tasmania from 15 December 2004 to 2 April 2008, prior to which he was the state's Chief Justice and Lieutenant Governor.

Early life
Born in Hobart to William Ellis Cox (d. 1970) and Alice Mary Mulcahy Cox (d. 1983), William John Ellis Cox was educated at St. Virgil's College, Hobart, Xavier College, Melbourne and the University of Tasmania. He graduated from the University of Tasmania with a Bachelor of Arts and a Bachelor of Laws in 1960 and was admitted to the Bar in the Supreme Court of Tasmania in March 1960. He was appointed a magistrate in 1976, and became a Queen's Counsel in 1978, during his term as the State's Crown Advocate (equivalent to Director of Public Prosecutions).

Career
Cox was appointed to the Supreme Court of Tasmania in 1982, and was the state's Chief Justice from 1995 until 2004. He was  appointed Lieutenant-Governor of Tasmania in 1996. In 1999, Cox was made a Companion of the Order of Australia (AC). He already held the Reserve Force Decoration (RFD) and the Army's Efficiency Decoration (ED) for service in the Royal Tasmania Regiment, which included a brief deployment to Vietnam.

Cox's most high profile court case was that of Martin Bryant, who shot dead 35 people at Port Arthur on 28 April 1996 and was brought before Cox for his trial six months later. Bryant admitted all 35 murders on 8 November and Cox sentenced him to life imprisonment fourteen days later, recommending that Bryant should stay in prison until he dies.

Governor of Tasmania
In August 2004, Cox became acting Governor of Tasmania upon the resignation of Richard Butler, and in November the Premier, Paul Lennon, announced that he had advised the Queen to appoint Cox as Governor of Tasmania. Cox is only the second Tasmanian-born governor in the state's history. The first was Sir Guy Green.

During his term, Cox was the Honorary Colonel of the Royal Tasmania Regiment and Honorary Air Commodore of the RAAF No. 29 (City of Hobart) Squadron.

Cox was succeeded as Governor on 2 April 2008 by Peter Underwood, Chief Justice of Tasmania.

In November 2015, Cox was appointed to conduct the first five yearly review into the Tasmanian Integrity Commission.

Family
Cox and his wife Jocelyn have three children.

References

1936 births
Living people
Governors of Tasmania
Chief Justices of Tasmania
Companions of the Order of Australia
Judges of the Supreme Court of Tasmania
20th-century Australian judges
21st-century Australian judges
Australian King's Counsel
Australian people of Irish descent
People from Hobart
People educated at Xavier College
People educated at St Virgil's College
Honorary air commodores of the Royal Australian Air Force